Wayne Fontes (born February 2, 1940) is a former American football coach and college and professional football player who was the head coach of the NFL's Detroit Lions from 1988 to 1996. His 67 wins and 71 losses are each the most for a head coach in team history.

Background and early career
Fontes was born in the fishing community of New Bedford, Massachusetts. According to the 1930 US Census, his mother, Matilda Fontes, was born in Wareham, Massachusetts. His father, Caetano Fontes, was Portuguese, born in Cape Verde, a Portuguese colony at the time. Fontes grew up in Canton, Ohio where he played football, basketball, and baseball at McKinley High School. He attended Michigan State University where he was an All-Big Ten defensive back. He graduated from MSU in 1962. 

After he was taken in the ninth round of the 1961 NFL Draft by the Philadelphia Eagles, Fontes played one year for the New York Titans of the American Football League. Fontes played nine games for the Titans in the 1962 season as a defensive back, recording four interceptions. He returned one interception 83 yards for a touchdown, a franchise record that would stand for 27 years.

After playing one season for the Titans, he injured his posterior cruciate ligament, and returned to MSU to obtain a Master's degree. He became an assistant coach at MSU in 1963. He then coached high school football and basketball at Bay City, Michigan's Visitation HS for two years losing only two games in his first year in 1964, and his team was undefeated in his second year in 1965, winning their league championship.  He later left for the University of Dayton to serve under head coach John McVay. He also served as an assistant coach at the University of Iowa and Southern California. He ultimately developed a close relationship with John McKay after working under his wing at USC, and went on to work as the defensive coordinator and defensive backs coach of the Tampa Bay Buccaneers from 1982–1984.

In the fall of 1987, Fontes pleaded guilty to driving while intoxicated after an incident in which he was originally also charged with possession of cocaine. The more serious charge was dropped, however.

Head coach
After 13 seasons as an assistant in the NFL, Fontes took over the Lions as interim head coach in mid-season of 1988 after head coach Darryl Rogers was fired. Fontes was regarded as somewhat of an up-and-comer in NFL coaching circles during his time in Tampa Bay as defensive backs coach under John McKay, and became a highly regarded ball skill and positioning educator for defensive backs in the "3–4" defense.

A personable "player's coach" and excellent motivator, Fontes was a key hire by Darryl Rogers, and would ultimately go on to coach Detroit for another seven seasons. The Lions were primed for success after William Clay Ford handed the job to Fontes in 1988, and the ownership pulled out all the stops – drafting Pro Bowl-caliber players such as Barry Sanders, Chris Spielman, Robert Porcher, Luther Ellis, Lomas Brown, Bennie Blades, Jason Hanson, Jerry Ball, Herman Moore, Kevin Glover, and Rodney Peete.

Detroit also made aggressive moves in free agency during this time, signing quarterback Scott Mitchell, who had previously been Dan Marino's backup in Miami, and Pat Swilling, who was acquired from the Saints for a first-round draft pick.

During Fontes' tenure, The Lions would have their most successful stretch since the AFL-NFL Merger, making the playoffs in 1991, 1993, 1994, and 1995 under his leadership. 

Fontes coached the 1991 and 1993 teams to the NFC Central Division title, with the latter being the franchise's last division championship as of 2023. The stretch from 1993-95 was the first time the franchise had three straight winning seasons since the team posted four consecutive winning seasons from 1969 to 1972.

The three straight postseason appearances -- and four in five seasons – was the franchise’s best run since the 1950s.

The 1991 Lions won 12 regular season games, which remains a franchise record. They defeated the Dallas Cowboys 38-6 in the Divisional Playoffs for the franchise's first -- and as of 2023, only -- postseason victory since 1957. The Lions lost in the NFC Championship game to eventual Super Bowl Champion Washington.

Fontes earned NFL Coach of the Year honors through the Associated Press and United Press International. Fontes' teams were known for their resilience in the regular season, finishing the 1991 season with six consecutive wins and the 1995 season with a franchise-record seven straight wins after starting the season 3-6. 

Unfortunately for Fontes, the Lions were unable to find consistent success in the postseason after 1991, losing in the Wildcard rounds in 1993, 1994, and 1995 -- and missing the postseason in 1992 and 1996. 

Fontes was fired after going 5-11 in 1996. Fontes' 66 regular season wins -- and 67 losses -- and are the most in franchise's history.

Head coaching record

Legacy
Fontes' ability to survive rumors of being fired earned him nicknames like "Big Buck" (stemming from a comparison he made between his job security and a hunted buck deer) and "Rasputin" (coined by Chris Berman due to Fontes' apparent ability to "miraculously" coax a winning streak out of his team every time he was about to be fired). Berman also referred to him as the "Nanook of the North" because of Fontes' desire to bundle up so heavily in the winter cold. He has also been referred to as "Mr. Snuffleupagus", due to his resemblance of the "Sesame Street" character of the same name. Fontes was also the brunt of many media jokes. Jokes like "Mr. Fontes is an expert in primary colors and beige" reflect the lack of respect that haunted his tenure.

Fontes was regarded as very personable, often joking with the media about his precarious job situation. He drew the line for this comedy though after the Detroit Free Press ridiculed him for sporting Mickey Mouse ears at a Disney charity.  The Free Press ran a tongue-in-cheek multiple choice quiz as to why he was wearing them the following day. The offbeat answers ranged from "Wearing his thinking cap" to "President of the Mouse Davis fan club". An irate Fontes slammed the media for making such a personal attack against him in such bad taste.  He said, "It ain't funny....if you don't like me, tell me. That's bull. Didn't like it at all. I did something for charity and for kids, and I'll keep doing things for charity and for kids."  This strong sense of compassion and sacrifice for others is what endeared most players to him.  The players responded to Fontes and always came to his defense when the coach fell into the "firing line".

Fontes' popularity waned in the later years of his career with the Lions. Many local media outlets and fans were openly critical of Fontes, correctly noting he amassed the most losses of any coach in Lions' history and that his overall record was under .500 -- while downplaying that he also had the most wins, and had a winning record in seven full seasons. The desolate years of mediocrity prior to Fontes seemed to be an afterthought, as was Fontes' role as a long time assistant in that mediocrity. Many felt the Lions were underachieving and that a change in leadership to a firm disciplinarian, such as Bobby Ross, would produce better results. The move backfired as Ross was never able to build a strong relationship with superstar running back Barry Sanders.  It is widely speculated that the hiring of Ross accelerated the retirement of Sanders, who was very close with Fontes. In ESPN's SportsCentury video on Barry Sanders, Sanders' father confirmed that his son contemplated retiring before the start of the 1997 season, which was to be Ross' first season as Lions coach. In his autobiography, "Now you see him", Sanders says of Wayne Fontes: "I thought he deserved another chance." ( p. 97)

As of 2022, Fontes is the only Lions coach to lead the team to a NFC championship game and the lone coach post-merger to win a postseason game. He led them to the playoffs in four out of eight seasons while he was head coach, including three consecutive playoff berths (1993, 1994, and 1995). He left the Lions compiling the most wins in franchise history (67), most playoff appearances (4), and is 9th (out of 23 coaches) in total win percentage.

It was rumored that Fontes drafted Barry Sanders in 1989 against the wishes of other members of the Lions staff, and accounts from some contemporaries do indicate that Fontes was definitely focused on acquiring Sanders. Barry Sanders made a point to thank Fontes for his guidance in his Pro Football Hall of Fame induction speech. The mutual admiration and respect between Fontes and Sanders was very strong and transcended beyond the football field.  Toward the end of his time in Detroit, an anti-Fontes sentiment grew among some Lions team members, but Sanders remained a staunch supporter of the coach. Of Fontes, Sanders said: "He proves that a coach can show affection and appreciation and still win." Sanders, to this day, credits Fontes for making him a superstar running back.

Fontes still supports local Detroit charities on occasion with his former players although those opportunities have been fewer as of late.  After serving briefly as a color commentator on the English-language broadcasts of NFL Europe games, Fontes retired to his home in Tarpon Springs, Florida. He is frequently spotted at Tampa Bay Buccaneers games where he maintains a strong friendship with Jim Gruden, father of former Buccaneers head coach Jon Gruden.

See also

 List of American Football League players

References

1940 births
Living people
American football cornerbacks
Dayton Flyers football coaches
Detroit Lions head coaches
Iowa Hawkeyes football coaches
Michigan State Spartans football coaches
Michigan State Spartans football players
National Football League defensive coordinators
New York Titans (AFL) players
USC Trojans football coaches
Tampa Bay Buccaneers coaches
High school basketball coaches in Michigan
High school football coaches in Michigan
Sportspeople from New Bedford, Massachusetts
Sportspeople from Canton, Ohio
People from Tarpon Springs, Florida
Players of American football from Canton, Ohio
Educators from Ohio
American people of Portuguese descent